Danko Kovačević (born 10 July 1991) is a Montenegrin football striker who most recently played for Selangor United.

Club career
Born in Cetinje, he started playing in the youth team of Red Star Belgrade before moving to FK Čukarički having played with them in the 2010–11 Serbian SuperLiga.  Then he moved to Doxa Drama F.C. and played in the 2011–12 Superleague Greece.  In summer 2012 he moved to Hungary and played with Kaposvári Rákóczi FC.  He was part of the squad in the 2012–13 Nemzeti Bajnokság I on five occasions but never got of the bench, and spent most of the time in the second team of Kaposvar playing in the Hungarian Second League.  During the winter break he moved to his native Montenegro and played the rest of the season with FK Lovćen although got only one appearance in the 2012–13 Montenegrin First League.  In summer 2013 he returned to Serbia and signed with FK BSK Borča who had just been relegated from the Serbian SuperLiga and play in the 2013–14 Serbian First League. Then he'd been played for 2 teams : Stal Stalowa Wola (Poland) in III liga (2015) and Iskar (Czech Republic)., which team is playing at Montenegrin First League from 2015-2016 Montenegrin First League to 2016-2017 Montenegrin First League. After playing for 2 different team in Europe, he moved to Vietnam and played for Sông Lam Nghe An and give that team champion Vietnamese National Football Cup 2017.
In the first of 2018, he'd been moved back to his country Montenegro and he played for Grbalj, which team is played at Montenegrin Second League.

In May 2019, Kovačević joined Selangor United.

International career
Danko Kocačević has been part of the Montenegrin U-19 team.

References

1991 births
Living people
Sportspeople from Cetinje
Association football forwards
Montenegrin footballers
Montenegro youth international footballers
FK Čukarički players
Doxa Drama F.C. players
Kaposvári Rákóczi FC players
FK Lovćen players
FK BSK Borča players
FK Čelik Nikšić players
FK Bežanija players
Stal Stalowa Wola players
FK Iskra Danilovgrad players
Song Lam Nghe An FC players
OFK Grbalj players
Serbian SuperLiga players
Super League Greece players
Nemzeti Bajnokság I players
Montenegrin First League players
Serbian First League players
II liga players
V.League 1 players
Montenegrin expatriate footballers
Expatriate footballers in Serbia
Montenegrin expatriate sportspeople in Serbia
Expatriate footballers in Greece
Montenegrin expatriate sportspeople in Greece
Expatriate footballers in Hungary
Montenegrin expatriate sportspeople in Hungary
Expatriate footballers in Poland
Montenegrin expatriate sportspeople in Poland
Expatriate footballers in Vietnam
Montenegrin expatriate sportspeople in Vietnam
Expatriate footballers in Malaysia
Montenegrin expatriate sportspeople in Malaysia